Abui may refer to:
 Abui language, a non-Austronesian language spoken by the Abui people of Indonesia
 Abui people, a group of indigenous people in Indonesia